Cymindis semenowi is a species of ground beetle in the subfamily Harpalinae. It was described by V. E. Jakovlev in 1890.

References

semenowi
Beetles described in 1890